This list includes individuals from the United States for whom there is a public petition to the bishop to commence an investigation into the heroic virtue of the individual leading to a decree declaring them to be a Servant of God.

 Andrew White (1579–1656), Professed Priest of the Jesuits (London, United Kingdom – Maryland, USA)
 Jacques Marquette (1637–1675), Professed Priest of the Jesuits (Hauts-de-France, France – Michigan, USA)
 Sébastien Rale (1657–1724), Professed Priest of the Jesuits; Martyr (Doubs, France – Maine, USA)
 Charles Nerinckx (1761–1824),  Missionary priest; Cofounder of the Sisters of Loretto (Herfelingen, Belgium – Kentucky, USA)
 Anne Marie Becraft (Aloysius) (1805–1833), Professed Religious of the Oblate Sisters of Providence (Washington, D.C. – Maryland, USA)
 Benjamin Marie Petit (1811–1839), Professed Priest of the Sulpicians (Rennes, France – Missouri, USA)
 Helio Koa'eloa (ca.1815–1846), Married Layperson of the Diocese of Honolulu (Hawaii, USA)
 Catherine Spalding (1793–1858), Founder of the Sisters of Charity of Nazareth (Maryland – Kentucky, USA)
 Mary Sybilla Riepp (Benedicta) (1825–1861), Professed Religious of the Benedictine Nuns (Bavarian Congregation) (Waal, Germany – Minnesota, USA)
 Francis Asbury Baker (1820–1865), Priest and Cofounder of the Missionary Society of Saint Paul the Apostle (Paulist Fathers) (Maryland – New York, USA)
 Robert Walsh (Arsenius) (1804–1869), Professed Priest of the Congregation of the Sacred Heart of Jesus and Mary (Picpus) (Ireland – Hawaii, USA)
 Jean-Marie Odin (1800–1870), Priest of the Congregation of the Mission (Vincentians); Archbishop of New Orleans (Ambierle, France – Louisiana, USA)
 Pierre Yves Kéralum (1817–1872), Professed Priest of the Missionary Oblates of Mary Immaculate (Finistère, France – Texas, USA)
 Pierre-Jean De Smet (1801–1873), Professed Priest of the Jesuits (Dendermonde, Belgium – Missouri, USA)
 Honora Mattingly (Ursula) (1808–1874), Vowed Member of the Daughters of Charity of Saint Vincent de Paul (Maryland, USA)
 Giovanni Paulo Pietrobattista (Pamfilo of Magliano) (1824–1876), Professed Priest of the Franciscan Friars Minor; Founder of the Franciscan Sisters of Alleghany and the Franciscan Sisters of Joliet (Sicily, Italy – Illinois, USA – Rome, Italy)
 Louis-Amadeus Rappe (1801–1877), Bishop of Cleveland; Founder of the Sisters of Charity of Saint Augustine (Audrehem, France – Vermont, USA)
 James Whelan (1823–1878), Professed Priest of the Dominicans; Bishop of Nashville; Founder of the Dominican Sisters of Saint Cecilia (Kilkenny, Ireland – Ohio, USA)
 Alice Mary Thorpe (Catherine Mary Antoninus) (1844–1879), Founder of the Dominican Sisters of Our Lady of the Rosary (now the Dominican Sisters of Sparkill) (England, United Kingdom – New York, USA)
 Anna Katharina Berger (Mary Odilia) (1823–1880), Founder of the Sisters of Saint Mary (now merged as Franciscan Sisters of Mary) (Regen, Germany – Missouri, USA)
 Franz Pirec (1785–1880), Priest of the Diocese of Saint Cloud (Godič, Slovenia – Minnesota, USA – Ljubljana, Slovenia)
 Caspar Rehrl (1809–1881), Priest of the Archdiocese of Milwaukee; Founder of the Sisters of Saint Agnes (Salzburg, Austria – Wisconsin, USA)
 Mary Hardey (Mary Aloysia) (1809–1886), Professed Religious of the Society of the Religious of the Sacred Heart of Jesus (Maryland, USA – Paris, France)
 Pierre Antoine Levy (d. 1886), Priest of the Diocese of Fort Worth (France – Texas, USA)
 Mary Frances Clarke (1803–1887), Founder of the Sisters of Charity of the Blessed Virgin Mary (Dublin, Ireland – Iowa, USA)
 Sebastian Wimmer (Boniface) (1809–1887), Professed Priest and Founder of the Benedictines (American-Cassinese Congregation) (Bavaria, Germany – Pennsylvania, USA)
 Franz Xaver Weninger (1805–1888), Professed Priest of the Jesuits (Styria, Austria (now Slovenia) – Ohio, USA)
 John Christopher Drumgoole (1816–1888), Priest of the Archdiocese of New York; Founder of the Sisters of Francis of the Mission of the Immaculate Virgin (Longford County, Ireland – New York, USA)
 Anna Hinkle (Euphrasie) (1847–1889), Professex Religious of the Sisters of Providence of Saint Mary-of-the-Woods (Kentucky – Illinois, USA)
 Thomas Scott Preston (1824–1891), Priest of the Archdiocese of New York; Founder of the Sisters of Divine Compassion (Connecticut – New York, USA)
 Honoria Conway (1815–1892), Founder of the Sisters of Charity of Saint John (now the Sisters of Charity of the Immaculate Conception) (England, United Kingdom – Massachusetts, USA)
 Almeide Maxis Duchemin (Theresa) (1810–1892), Cofounder of the Sisters Servants of the Immaculate Heart of Mary and the Oblate Sisters of Providence (Maryland – Pennsylvania, USA)
 Elizabeth Hayes (Mary Ignatius of Jesus) (1823–1894), Founder of the Franciscan Missionary Sisters of the Immaculate Conception (Guernsey, United Kingdom – Minnesota, USA – Rome, Italy)
 Patrick Manogue (1831–1895), Bishop of Sacramentp (Kilkenny, Ireland – California, USA)
 Adele Brise (Marie Joseph) (1831–1896), Consecrated Virgin of the Diocese of Green Bay; Member of the Secular Franciscans (Belgium – Wisconsin, USA)
 Princess Angeline [Kikisublo] (c. 1820–1896), Layperson of the Archdiocese of Seattle (Washington, USA)
 Augustine Francis Hewit (1820–1897), Priest and Cofounder of the Missionary Society of Saint Paul the Apostle (Paulist Fathers) (Connecticut – New York, USA)
 Mary Ellen O'Connell (Anthony) (1814–1897), Professed Religious of the Sisters of Charity of Cincinnati (Limerick, Ireland – Ohio, USA)
 Joseph Jessing (1836–1899), Priest of the Diocese of Columbus (Münster, Germany – Ohio, USA)
 Marie-Catherine Moes (Mary Alfred) (1828–1899), Founder of the Sisters of Saint Francis of Mary Immaculate and the Sisters of Saint Francis of Rochester (Remich, Luxembourg – Minnesota, USA)
 Ignatius Mrak (1810–1901), Bishop of Marquette (Hotovlja, Slovenia – Michigan, USA)
 Eliza Ellen Starr (1824–1901), Layperson of the Archdiocese of Chicago (Massachusetts – Illinois, USA)
 Esther Pariseau (Marie-Joseph of the Sacred Heart) (1823–1902), Professed Religious of the Sisters of Providence of Montréal (Québec, Canada – Washington, USA)
 George Deshon (1823–1903), Priest and Cofounder of the Missionary Society of Saint Paul the Apostle (Paulist Fathers) (Connecticut – New York, USA)
 Gulstan-Francois Ropert (1839–1903), Professed Priest of the Congregation of the Sacred Hearts of Jesus and Mary (Picpus); Apostolic Vicar of the Hawaiian Islands; Titular Bishop of Panopolis (Vannes, France – Hawaii, USA)
 Mary Hazotte (Agnes) (1847–1905), Cofounder of the Sister of Saint Agnes (New York – Kansas, USA)
 Samuel Henderson (c. 1822–1907), Married Layperson of the Diocese of Memphis (Tennessee, USA)
 John Green Hanning (Mary Joachim) (1849–1908), Professed Religious of the Trappists (Kentucky, USA)
 Francis Xavier Prefontaine (1838–1909), Priest of the Archdiocese of Seattle (Québec, Canada – Washington, USA)
 Catherine Mehegan (Mary Xavier) (1825–1915), Founder of the Sisters of Charity of Saint Elizabeth (County Cork, Ireland – New Jersey, USA)
 Patrick Heslin (1857–1921), Priest of the Archdiocese of San Francisco; Martyr (Longford, Ireland – California, USA)
 James Edwin Coyle (1873–1921), Priest of the Diocese of Birmingham; Martyr (Roscommon, Ireland – Alabama, USA)
 Mary Walsh (1850–1922), Founder of the Dominican Sisters of the Sick Poor (New York, USA)
 Marie Bibeau (Marie-Anne de Jésus) (1865–1924), Founder of the Little Franciscans of Mary (Lower Canada, Canada – Massachusetts, USA)
 Anna Cordelia Zervas (Mary Annella) (1900–1926), Professed Religious of the Benedictine Nuns (Bavarian Congregation) (Minnesota, USA)
 Helena Pelczar (1888–1926), Layperson of the Diocese of Cleveland (Korczyna, Poland – Ohio, USA)
 Albert Etlin (Lukas) (1864–1927), Professed Priest of the Benedictines (Swiss-American Congregation) (Switzerland – Missouri, USA)
 Emma Franziska Höll (Mary Alexia) (1838–1929), Founder of the School Sisters of Saint Francis (Baden-Württemberg, Germany – Wisconsin, USA)
 Elizabeth Barbara Williams (Mary Theodore) (1868–1931), Founder of the Franciscan Handmaids of the Most Pure Heart of Mary (Louisiana – New York, USA)
 Missionary Martyrs of China:
 Walter Coveyou (Walter of the Seven Sorrows of Mary) (1894–1929), Professed Priest of the Passionists (Michigan, USA – Hunan, China)
 Lawrence Seybold (Clement of Saint Michael) (1896–1929), Professed Priest of the Passionists (New York, USA – Hunan, China)
 Claude Holbein (Godfrey of Jesus) (1899–1929), Professed Priest of the Passionists (Maryland, USA – Hunan, China)
 Gerard Donovan (1904–1938), Priest of the Maryknoll Missionary Society (Pennsylvania, USA – Liaoning, China)
 Otto Rauschenbach (1898–1945), Priest of the Maryknoll Missionary Society (Missouri, USA – Guangdong, China)
 James Luke Devine (1905–1947), Professed Priest of the Dominicans (Pennsylvania, USA – Fujian, China)
 Ambrose Kanoealu'i Hutchison (ca. 1856–1932), Married Layperson of the Diocese of Honolulu (Hawaii, USA)
 Benjamin Joseph Salmon (1888–1932), Married Layperson of the Archdiocese of Chicago (Colorado – Illinois, USA)
 Daniel Rudd (1854–1933), Layperson of the Archdiocese of Louisville (Kentucky, USA)
 Anton Frank (Eugene) (1900–1935), Professed Religious of the Society of the Divine Word; Martyr (Illinois, USA – Morobe, Papua New Guinea)
 Lurana Mary White (1870–1935), Founder of the Franciscan Sisters of the Atonement (New York, USA)
 Marie Rose Ferron (1902–1936), Layperson of the Diocese of Providence (Quebec, Canada – Rhode Island, USA)
 Margaret Reilly (Mary of the Crown of Thorns) (1884–1937), Professed Religious of the Religious of the Good Shepherd (New York, USA)
 Johanna Butler (Marie Joseph) (1860–1940), Professed Religious of the Religious of the Sacred Heart of Mary (Kilkenny, Ireland – New York, USA)
 Mary Frances Cunningham (Mary Demetrias) (1859–1940), Founder of the Mission Helpers of the Sacred Heart (Washington, D.C. – Maryland, USA)
 Edward Proctor Whealan (Peter Damian) (1908–1941), Professed Religious of the Brothers of the Christian Schools (De La Salle Brothers); Martyr (New Jersey, USA – Wang Chai, Hong Kong)
 James Gerald Hennessey (1905–1942), Priest of the Archdiocese of Boston; Martyr (Massachusetts, USA – near Fuga Island, Cagayan, Philippines)
 Martyrs of Morotai (North Maluku, Indonesia):
 Paul Bernard Drone (1913–1942), Professed Priest of the Missionary Oblates of Mary Immaculate (Missouri, USA)
 Michael Braun (1914–1942), Professed Priest of the Missionary Oblates of Mary Immaculate (Missouri, USA)
 Edward McMahon (1916–1942), Professed Priest of the Missionary Oblates of Mary Immaculate (Massachusetts, USA)
 Leopoldina Burns (1855–1942) (Maria Leopoldina), Professed Religious of the Franciscan Sisters of Syracuse (New York, USA – Hawaii, USA)
 Arthur Duhamel (1908–1942), Professed Priest of the Society of Mary (Marist Missionaries); Martyr (Massachusetts, USA – Guadalcanal, Solomon Islands)
 John Patrick Washington (1908–1943), Priest of the Archdiocese of Newark (New Jersey, USA – Atlantic Ocean)
 Joseph Kotrba (1913–1943), Professed Priest of the Society of the Divine Word; Martyr (Illinois, USA – Madang, Papua New Guinea)
 Alfredo Salois (Victor) (1908–1943), Professed Religious of the Society of the Divine Word; Martyr (Michigan, USA – near Manus, Papua New Guinea)
 Agnes Kötter (Adelaide) (1907–1943), Professed Religious of the Missionary Sisters Servants of the Holy Spirit; Martyr (Minnesota, USA – near Manus, Papua New Guinea)
 John Conley (1898–1943), Professed Priest of the Society of Mary (Marist Missionaries); Martyr (Pennsylvania, USA – Bougainville, Papua New Guinea)
 Aloysius Schmitt (1909–1944), Priest of the Archdiocese of Dubuque (Iowa, USA – Hawaii, USA)
 Anna Ruholl (Dolorosia) (1892–1944), Professed Religious of the Missionary Sisters Servants of the Holy Spirit; Martyr (Illinois, USA – Papua, Indonesia)
 Claude Newman (1923–1944), Young Layperson of the Diocese of Little Rock (Arkansas, USA – Mississippi, USA)
 Jesus Baza Dueñas (1911–1944), Priest of the Archdiocese of Agana; Martyr (Agana, Guam – Mangilao, Guam (U.S. Territory))
 James Paul McCloskey (1870–1945), Bishop of Jaro (Pennsylvania, USA – Iloilo, Philippines)
 William Thomas Cummings (1903–1945), Priest of the Maryknoll Missionary Society; Martyr (California, USA – Manila, Philippines)
 Antoinette Kunkel (Hyacinth) (1898–1945), Professed Religious of the Maryknoll Sisters of St. Dominic; Martyr (New York, USA – Benguet, Philippines)
 Ignatius Francis Lissner (1867–1948), Professed Priest of the Society of African Missions; Founder of the Handmaids of the Pure Heart of Mary (Alsace, France – Dahomey, Benin – Georgia, USA)
 Pierre Joseph Oristide Maurin (1877–1949), Layperson of the Archdiocese of New York; Founder of the Catholic Worker Movement (Oultet, France – New York, USA)
 Mary Giesen (Mary Augustine) (1860–1950), Founder of the Sisters of Saint Francis of Maryville (Minnesota – Missouri, USA)
 Joseph Augustine Mattingly (Sylvan) (1882–1951), Professed Religious of the Xaverian Brothers; Founder of the Our Lady's Rosary Makers (Kentucky, USA)
 William Howard Bishop (1885-1953), Priest of the Archdiocese of Cincinnati; Founder of the Home Missioners of America (Glenmary Home Missioners) and the Home Mission Sisters of America (Glenmary Sisters) (Illinois, USA)
 Helena Agnes Franey (Marie Helene) (1898–1953), Professed Religious of the Sisters of Providence of Saint Mary-of-the-Woods (Illinois – Indiana, USA)
 Mollie Rogers (Mary Joseph) (1882–1955), Cofounder of the Maryknoll Sisters of Saint Dominic (Massachusetts – New York, USA)
 Nancy Hamilton (1942–1956), Child of the Diocese of Monterey (California, USA)
 Marion Lane Gurney (1868–1957), Founder of the Sisters of Our Lady of Christian Doctrine (Louisiana – New York, USA)
 Edward Garesché (1876-1960), Professed Priest of the Jesuits; Founder of the Sons of Mary, Health of the Sick (Missouri - Massachusetts, USA)
 Thomas Anthony Dooley III (1927–1961), Layperson of the Archdiocese of New York (Missouri, USA – Saigon, Vietnam – New York, USA)
 William Kruegler Hernberg (1930–1962), Priest of the Maryknoll Missionary Society; Martyr (New York, USA – Santa Cruz, Bolivia)
 John LaFarge Jr. (1880-1963), Professed Priest of the Jesuits (Rhode Island - New York, USA)
 Joseph Timothy O'Callahan (1905–1964), Professed Priest of the Jesuits (Massachusetts, USA)
 Mary Flannery O'Connor (1925–1964), Layperson of the Diocese of Savannah (Georgia, USA)
 Anthony Joseph Brouwers (1912–1964), Priest of the Archdiocese of Los Angeles (California, USA)
 Henri Roy (1898-1965), Professes Priest of the Missionary Oblates of Mary Immaculate; Founder of the Secular Institute "Pius X" (Maine, USA - Quebec, Canada)
 Bridget Della Mary Gavin (Mary Ignatia) (1889–1966), Professed Religious of the Sisters of Charity of Saint Aigustine (County Mayo, Ireland – Ohio, USA)
 Bruce Phillip Smith (1920–1967), Layperson of the Archdiocese of Saint Paul and Minneapolis (Minnesota, USA)
 John Courtney Murray (1904-1967), Professed Priest of the Jesuits (New York, USA)
 Adolph John Paschang (1895-1968), Priest of the Maryknoll Missionary Society; Bishop of Jiangmen [Kongmoon]; Titular Bishop of Sasima (Missouri, USA - Hong Kong, China)
 Paul John Hallinan (1911-1968), Archbishop of Atlanta (Ohio - Georgia, USA)
 Thomas Merton (Louis) (1915–1968), Professed Priest of the Trappists (Pyrénées-Orientales, France – Kentucky, USA – Bangkok, Thailand)
 Robert Raymond Brett (1936–1968), Professed Priest of the Society of Mary (Marist Missionaries); Martyr (Pennsylvania, USA – Quång Trị, Vietnam)
 Gerald Michael Fitzgerald (1894–1969), Priest and Founder of the Servants of the Paraclete and the Handmaids of the Precious Blood (Massachusetts – New Mexico, USA)
 Catherine Anne Cesnik (1942–1969), Professed Religious of the School Sisters of Notre Dame; Martyr (Pennsylvania – Maryland, USA)
 Joseph Clifford Fenton (1906-1969), Priest of the Diocese of Springfield (Massachusetts, USA)
 Renaud Bouffard (1931-1971), Professed Priest of the Missionar Oblates of Mary Immaculate; Martyr (Maine, USA - Chardonnières, Haiti)
 Roberto Enrique Clemente Walker (1934–1972), Married Layperson of the Archdiocese of San Juan de Puerto Rico (Carolina, Puerto Rico)
 Thomas Harold Colgan (1894–1972), Priest of the Archdiocese of Newark; Founder of the Blue Army of Our Lady of Fatima (World Apostolate of Fatima) (New Jersey, USA – Florida, USA)
 Daniel "Danny" Croteau (1959-1972), Child of the Diocese of Springfield; Martyr (Massachusetts, USA)
 Paul Francis Leibold (1914–1972), Archbishop of Cincinnati (Ohio, USA)
 Gordon Edward Murphy (1918-1972), Professed Priest of the Jesuits (Illinois, USA - Patna, India)
 Martin Cabo (Marcellus) (1915–1974), Professed Priest of the Franciscan Friars Minor; Martyr (Illinois, USA – Wisconsin, USA)
 Patrick Crowley (1911-1974), Married Layperson of the Archdiocese of Chicago; Founder of the Christian Family Movement (Illinois, USA)
 Bernard Francis Meyer (1891-1975), Priest of the Maryknoll Missionary Society; Apostolic Prefect of Wuzhou (Iowa, USA - Wuchow, China -New York, USA)
 Raymond Herman Pint (1930-1975), Priest of the Archdiocese of Dubuque; Martyr (Iowa - Cochabamba, Bolivia)
 William Gauchat (1907-1975), Married Layperson of the Diocese of Cleveland (Ohio, USA)
 William Woods (1931–1976), Priest of the Maryknoll Missionary Society; Martyr (Texas, USA – El Quiché, Guatemala)
 Dietrich von Hildebrand (1889–1977), Married Layperson of the Archdiocese of New York (Florence, Italy – New York, USA)
 Thomas Wyatt Turner (1877–1978), Married Layperson of the Archdiocese of Washington D.C. (Maryland – Washington, D.C.)
 Catherine Passananti (1894–1978), Layperson of the Archdiocese of Boston (Massachusetts, USA)
 Reynold Henry Hillenbrand (1904-1979), Priest of the Archdiocese of Chicago (Illinois, USA)
 Martha Euphemia Lofton Haynes (1890-1980), Married Layperson of the Archdiocese of Washington D.C. (Washington D.C., USA)
 Carol Ann Piette (Rose Carol) (1939–1980), Professed Religious of the Maryknoll Sisters of Saint Dominic (Wisconsin, USA – Cara Sucia, El Salvador)
 August Mauge (1910–1980), Layperson of the Diocese of Steubenville; Cofounder of the Apostolate for Family Consecration (Pennsylvania – Ohio, USA)
 Martyrs of La Paz, El Salvador:
 Mary Elizabeth Clarke (Maura) (1931–1980), Professed Religious of the Maryknoll Sisters of Saint Dominic (New York, USA)
 Ita Catherine Ford (1940–1980), Professed Religious of the Maryknoll Sisters of Saint Dominic (New York, USA)
 Dorothea Lu Kazel [Dorothy] (1939–1980), Professed Religious of the Ursuline Sisters of the Roman Union (Ohio, USA)
 Jean Marie Donovan (1953–1980), Layperson of the Diocese of Cleveland (Connecticut, USA)
 John Howard Griffin (1920-1980), Married Layperson of the Diocese of Dallas; Member of the Lay Carmelites (Texas, USA)
 James Edward Walsh (1891–1981), Priest of the Maryknoll Missionary Society; Bishop of Jiangmen (Maryland – New York, USA)
 Horace McKenna (1899–1982), Professed Priest of the Jesuits (New York – Washington, D.C., USA)
 Grace Kelly Grimaldi (1929–1982), Married Layperson of the Archdiocese of Monaco (Pennsylvania, USA – Monaco City, Monaco)
 John Leary (1958-1982), Young Layperson of the Archdiocese of Boston; Member of the Catholic Worker Movement (Massachusetts, USA)
 James Francis Carney (Guadalupe) (1924-1983), Professed Priest of the Jesuits; Martyr (Illinois, USA - Honduras)
 Marion Ganey (1904-1984), Professed Priest of the Jesuits (Illinois, USA - Western Fiji, Fiji,)
 Martyrs of La Crosse, Wisconsin:
 John Daniel Rossiter (1920–1985), Priest of the Diocese of La Crosse (Wisconsin, USA)
 Ferdinand Roth Sr. (1912–1985), Married Layperson of the Diocese of La Crosse (Wisconsin, USA)
 William George Hammes (1918–1985), Married Layperson of the Diocese of La Crosse (Wisconsin, USA)
 Lena Frances Edwards (1900–1986), Married Layperson of the Diocese of Trenton; Member of the Secular Franciscans (Washington, D.C. – New Jersey, USA)
 Lawrence Lovasik (1913-1986), Professed Priest of the Society of the Divine Word; Founder of the Sisters of Divine Spirit and the Family Service Secular Institute (Pennsylvania, USA)
 Frances Elizabeth Kent (Mary Corita) (1918–1986), Professed Religious of the Sisters of the Immaculate Heart of Mary (Iowa – Massachusetts, USA)
 Elizabeth Hirschboeck (Mary Mercy) (1903–1986), Professed Religious of the Maryknoll Sisters of Saint Dominic (New York, USA)
 Kathryn Wick (Claire Marie) (1915–1987), Professed Religious of the Hospitaller Sisters of Saint Francis (USA-Kenya)
 Jessica Powers (Miriam of the Holy Spirit) (1905–1988), Professed Religious of the Discalced Carmelite Nuns (Wisconsin, USA)
 Agnes Reinkemeyer (1923-1989), Professed Religious of the Franciscan Sisters of Mary; Martyr (Missouri, USA - Tana River, Kenya)
 Raymond Anthony Adams (1935-1989), Professed Priest of the Jesuits; Martyr (New York, USA - Cape Coast, Ghana)
 Penny Lernoux Nahum (1940-1989), Married Layperson of the Diocese of San Jose in California (California - New York, USA)
 Robert Louis Hodapp (1910-1989), Professed Priest of the Jesuits; Bishop of Belize City-Belmopan (Minnesota, USA - Belize City, Belize)
 Walker Percy (1916–1990), Married Layperson of the Archdiocese of New Orleans (Alabama – Louisiana, USA)
 Eugene John Herbert (1923–1990), Professed Priest of the Jesuits; Martyr (Louisiana, USA – Batticaloa, Sri Lanka)
 Maurice Patrick Barrett (Mathias) (1900–1990), Founder of the Little Brothers of the Good Shepherd (Waterford, Ireland – New Mexico, USA)
 Julia Crotta (Nazarena of Jesus) (1907–1990), Professed Religious of the Benedictine Nuns (Camaldolese Congregation) (Connecticut, USA – Rome, Italy)
 Maureen Courtney (1944-1990), Professed Religious of the Congregation of Saint Agnes; Martyr (Wisconsin, USA - Atlántico Norte, Nicaragua)
 Harold Arnoldus Stevens (1907-1990), Married Layperson of the Archdiocese of New York (South Carolina - New York, USA)
 Eliseo Castaño de Vega (1925–1991), Priest of the Congregation of the Mission; Martyr (Zamora, Spain – San Juan, Puerto Rico)
 Martyrs of Gardnersville (Montserrado, Liberia):
 Barbara Ann Muttra (1923-1992), Professed Religious of the Adorers of the Blood of Christ (Illinois, USA)
 Mary Joel Kolmer (1934-1992), Professed Religious of the Adorers of the Blood of Christ (Illinois, USA)
 Shirley Kolmer (1920-1992), Professed Religious of the Adorers of the Blood of Christ (Illinois, USA)
 Agnes Mueller (1929-1992), Professed Religious of the Adorers of the Blood of Christ (Illinois, USA)
 Kathleen McGuire (1937-1992), Professed Religious of the Adorers of the Blood of Christ (Illinois, USA)
 James Patterson Lyke (1939-1992), Professed Priest of the Franciscan Friars Minor; Archbishop of Atlanta (Illinois - Georgia, USA)
 Richard Henry Ackerman (1903-1992), Professed Priest of the Congregation of the Holy Spirit (Spiritans); Bishop of Covington (Pennsylvania - Kentucky, USA)
 César Estrada Chávez (1927–1993), Married Layperson of the Diocese of Tucson (Arizona, USA)
 Ann Manganaro (1946-1993), Professed Religious of the Sisters of Loreto (Missouri, USA - San Salvador, El Salvador)
 Enrique San Pedro Fonaguera (1928–1994), Professed Priest of the Jesuits; Bishop of Brownsville (Havana, Cuba – Florida, USA)
 Veronica McDonald Lueken (1923–1995), Married Layperson of the Diocese of Brooklyn (New York, USA)
 Joseph Louis Bernardin (1928–1996), Archbishop of Chicago; Cardinal (South Carolina, USA – Illinois, USA)
 Lawrence Jenco (1934–1996), Professed Priest of the Servites (Illinois, USA)
 Mary Evelyn Puleo Chmiel (1963–1996), Married Layperson of the Archdiocese of St. Louis; Member of the Catholic Worker Movement (Rio de Janeiro, Brazil – Missouri, USA)
 Ann Patricia McAleese (1934-1996), Professed Religious of the Sisters of the Presentation of the Blessed Virgin Mary; Martyr (New York, USA - Cape Coast, Ghana)
 Henri Jozef Machiel Nouwen (1932–1996), Priest of the Archdiocese of Utrecht (Nijkerk, Netherlands – Minnesota, USA – Ontario, Canada)
 Ruth Van Kooy Pakaluk (1956–1998), Married Layperson of the Prelature of the Holy Cross and Opus Dei (Massachusetts, USA)
 Charles Kekumano (1919-1998), Priest of the Diocese of Honolulu (Hawaii, USA)
 Thomas Gafney (1932-1998), Professed Priest of the Jesuits; Martyr (Ohio, USA - Kathmandu, Nepal)
 Vincent Donovan (1926–2000), Professed Priest of the Congregation of the Holy Spirit (Spiritans) (Pennsylvania, USA)
 Mary Mildred Neuzil (Mary Ephrem) (1916–2000), Professed Religious of the Contemplative Sisters of the Indwelling Trinity (New York – Ohio, USA)
 Daniel Egan (1915–2000), Professed Priest of the Franciscan Friras of the Atonement (New York, USA)
 Isolina Ferré Aguayo (1914–2000), Professed Religious of the Missionary Servants of the Most Blessed Trinity (Ponce, Puerto Rico)
 Ignatius Kung Pin-Mei (1901–2000), Bishop of Shanghai; Cardinal (Shanghai, China – Connecticut, USA)
 John Anthony Kaiser (1932–2000), Priest of the Mill Hill Missionaries; Martyr (Minnesota, USA – Nakuru, Kenya)
 Charles William Kram Jr. (1929–2000), Priest of the Diocese of Victoria (Texas, USA)
 John Joseph O'Connor (1920–2000), Archbishop of New York; Cardinal; Founder of the Sisters of Life (Pennsylvania, USA – New York, USA)
 Harry Murray (Gratian) (1923–2000), Priest of the Diocese of Bacolod (Pennsylvania, USA – Negros Occidental, Philippines)
 Eileen Egan (1912–2000), Layperson of the Archdiocese of New York (Wales, United Kingdom – New York, USA)
 Jan Karski (1914-2000), Married Layperson of the Archdiocese of Washington (Lodz, Poland - Washington, D.C., USA)
 Dorothy Helen Schmitt Gauchat (1921-2000), Married Layperson of the Diocese of Cleveland (Ohio, USA)
 Barbara Ann Ford (1938–2001), Professed Religious of the Sisters of Charity of New York; Martyr (New York, USA – Guatemala City, Guatemala)
 Robert Emmett Judge (Mychal Fallon) (1933–2001), Professed Priest of the Franciscan Friars Minor (New York, USA)
 John Matthias Haffert (1915–2001), Married Layperson of the Archdiocese of Newark; Cofounder of the Blue Army of Our Lady of Fatima (World Apostolate of Fatima) (New Jersey, USA – Fatima, Portugal)
 Mathew Ahmann (1931-2001), Married Layperson of the Diocese of Saint Cloud (Minnesota – Washington, D.C., USA)
 Joseph Gluszek (1910–2002), Priest of the Diocese of Great Falls-Billings (Kraków, Poland – Montana, USA)
 Mary Frank Stachowicz (1951–2002), Married Layperson of the Archdiocese of Chicago; Martyr (Poland – Illinois, USA)
 Ade Bethune (1914–2002), Layperson of the Diocese of Providence; Member of the Catholic Worker Movement (Schaerbeek, Belgium – Rhode Island, USA)
 José Gerónimo Lluberas Acosta (1923-2003), Married Layperson of the Diocese of Ponce (Ponce, Puerto Rico - Georgia, USA)
 Michael Allen Gaworski (1958-2003), Founder of the Franciscan Brothers of Peace (Minnesota, USA)
 Mary Philomena Fogarty (Mary Coirle) (1935-2003), Professed Religious of the Franciscan Missionaries of Mary (Cork, Ireland - Virginia, USA)
 Matthew Joseph Thaddeus Stepanek (1990-2004), Child of the Archdiocese of Baltimore (Maryland, USA)
 Zdisław Kobak (Cantius) (1930–2004), Professed Priest of the Franciscan Friars Minor (Torun, Poland – Samar, Philippines – Wisconsin, USA)
 Daria Donnelly Weissburg (1959–2004), Married Layperson of the Archdiocese of Boston (Pennsylvania – Massachusetts, USA)
 Robert Pennington (Basil) (1931–2005), Professed Priest of the Trappists (New York – Massachusetts, USA)
 Venard Poslusney (1917–2005), Professed Priest of the Carmelites of the Ancient Observance (Pennsylvania – New Jersey, USA)
 Thomas Richard Heath (1920–2005), Professed Priest of the Dominicans; Martyrs (Massachusetts, USA – Kisumu, Kenya)
 Dorothy Mae Stang (1931–2005), Professed Religious of the Sisters of Notre Dame de Namur; Martyr (Ohio, USA – Pará, Brazil)
 Patricia Caron Crowley (1913-2006), Married Layperson of the Archdiocese of Chicago; Founder of the Christian Family Movement (Illinois, USA)
 Edward Warren (1926–2006), Married Layperson of the Diocese of Bridgeport (Connecticut, USA)
 Audrey Marie Santo (1983–2007), Young Layperson of the Diocese of Worcester (Massachusetts, USA)
 Margaret Mary Leo (1993–2007), Child of the Diocese of Arlington (Virginia, USA)
 Joan Gormley (Frances) (1937-2007), Vowed Member of the Daughters of Charity of Saint Vincent de Paul (Pennsylvania, USA)
 Francis Marino (1925-2007), Professed Priest of the Society of Mary, Marist Missionaries; Founder of the Anawim Community (Massachusetts, USA - Manila, Philippines)
 Avery Robert Dulles (1918–2008), Professed Priest of the Jesuits; Cardinal (New York, USA)
 Cristeta Lim (Grace Dorothy) (1926-2008), Professed Religious of the Maryknoll Sisters of Saint Dominic (Ilocos Sur, Philippines - Hawaii, USA)
 Dorothy Hennessey (1913-2008), Professed Religious of the Sisters of the Third Order of Saint Francis of the Holy Family (Iowa, USA)
 Mary Ann Wright (1921–2009), Married Layperson of the Archdiocese of Santa Fe (Louisiana, USA – California, USA)
 Eunice Kennedy Shriver (1921–2009), Married Layperson of the Archdiocese of Baltimore (Maryland – Massachusetts, USA)
 Lawrence Rosabaugh (Lorenzo) (1935–2009), Professed Priest of the Missionary Oblates of Mary Immaculate; Martyr (Wisconsin, USA – Guatemala)
 Robert Fox (1927–2009), Priest of the Diocese of Sioux Falls; Founder of the Fatima Family Apostolate and the Youths for Fatima Pilgrimages (South Dakota, USA)
 Patrick Francis Rager (1959–2010), Priest of the Diocese of Pittsburgh (Pennsylvania, USA)
 Anita Figueredo Villegas de Doyle (1916-2010), Married Layperson of the Diocese of San Diego (San Jose, Costa Rica - California, USA)
 Edward Dougherty (1925–2011), Priest of the Diocese of Trenton (Pennsylvania, USA)
 Robert Sargent Shriver Jr. (1915–2011), Married Layperson of the Archdiocese of Baltimore (Maryland, USA)
 Warren Hasty Carroll (1932–2011), Married Layperson of the Diocese of Arlington (Maine – Virginia, USA)
 Philip Matthew Hannan (1914-2011), Archbishop of New Orleans (Washington D.C. - Louisiana, USA)
 Julian and Adrian Riester (1919 - 2011) Professed Priests of the Franciscan Friars Minor (Buffalo, New York - St. Petersburg, Florida, USA) 
 Albert Henry Ottenweller (1916–2012), Bishop of Steubenville; Founder of the Franciscan Sisters of Penance of the Sorrowful Mother (Montana – Ohio, USA)
 Walter Francis Sullivan (1928–2012), Bishop of Richmond (Washington, D.C. – Virginia, USA)
 James Reuter (1916–2012), Professed Priest of the Jesuits (New Jersey, USA – Parañaque, Philippines)
 Mary Jean Forge Perrini (1957–2012), Married Layperson of the Archdiocese of Kansas City (Kansas, USA)
 Carol Therese Ameche (1934-2013), Married Layperson of the Diocese of Phoenix (Arizona, USA)
 Thomas Walters (Hilarion) (1918-2013), Professed Priest of the Passionists (Pennsylvania, USA - Quezon City, Philippines)
 Paul [Pablo] Straub (1932–2013), Professed Priest of the Redemptorists; Founder of the Institute of the Consecrated Sisters of the Most Holy Savior (New York, USA – Quintana Roo, Mexico)
 Scott Carroll (1966–2013), Priest of the Diocese of Toledo (Ohio, USA)
 Mary Clarke Brenner (Antonia) (1926–2013), Founder of the Eudists Servants of the Eleventh Hour (California, USA – Tijuana, Mexico)
 Brendan Joseph Kelly (1998–2013), Child of the Diocese of Arlington (Virginia, USA)
 Ignatius Anthony Catanello (1938-2013), Auxiliary Bishop of Brooklyn; Titular Bishop of Deultum (New York, USA)
 Julia Ann Smollin (Anne Bryan) (1943–2014), Professed Religious of the Sisters of Saint Joseph of Carondelet (New York, USA)
 Kenneth Walker (1985–2014), Priest of the Fraternal Society of Saint Peter; Martyr (Arizona, USA)
 Robert Peter Groeschel (Benedict Joseph) (1933–2014), Professed Priest and Founder of the Franciscan Friars of the Renewal; Founder of the Franciscan Sisters of the Renewal (New Jersey, USA)
 Nathan Benjamin Trapuzzano (1989–2014), Married Layperson of the Archdiocese of Indianapolis (Pennsylvania – Indiana, USA)
 Pauline Eve Macaluso Lord (Penny) (1927–2014), Married Layperson of the Diocese of Little Rock (New York, USA – Arkansas, USA)
 Stuart Ignatius Long (1963-2014), Priest of the Diocese of Helena (Washington – Montana, USA)
 Mary Jo Tacke (Mary Paule) (1923–2014), Professed Religious of the Missionary Sisters of the Precious Blood; Martyr (Idaho, USA – Eastern Cape, South Africa)
 Paul Joseph O'Donnell (1959-2015), Cofounder of the Franciscan Brothers of Peace (Nebraska - Minnesota, USA)
 Tom Seagrave (1942–2015), Priest of the Archdiocese of San Francisco (California, USA)
 James Curran (1932–2015), Founder of the Little Brothers of Saint Francis (Massachusetts, USA)
 Dorothy Marie Barrett (Mary Adrian) (1929-2015), Professed Religious of the Sisters Servants of the Immaculate Heart of Mary (Pennsylvania, USA)
 Joseph Mario Reali (1989-2015), Young Layperson of the Archdiocese of New York; Member of the Knights of Columbus (Connecticut - New York, USA)
 Alexander Joseph Toczko (1919-2015) and Jeannette Dolores Malachowski Toczko (1919-2015), Married Layperson of the Diocese of San Diego (California, USA)
 Bob Lord (1935–2016), Married Layperson of the Diocese of Little Rock (New York, USA – Arkansas, USA)
 Rita Antoinette Rizzo (Mary Angelica of the Annunciation) (1923–2016), Professed Religious of the Poor Clares of Perpetual Adoration; Founder of the Franciscan Missionaries of the Eternal Word and the Knights of the Holy Eucharist (Ohio, USA – Alabama, USA)
 Peter John Hopkins (1925–2016), Married Layperson of the Diocese of Nashville (Wyoming – Tennessee, USA)
 Daniel Berrigan (1921–2016), Professed Priest of the Jesuits (Minnesota – New York, USA)
 Rosemae Pender (1921–2016), Founder of the Franciscan Sisters of the Eucharist (Illinois, USA – Connecticut, USA)
 Marvin Alfred Mottet (1930–2016), Priest of the Diocese of Davenport (Iowa, USA)
 James Henry Flanagan (1924-2016), Priest of the Archdiocese of Santa Fe; Founder of the Society of Our Lady of the Most Holy Trinity (Massachusetts - New Mexico, USA)
 Phyllis Stewart Schlafly (1924–2016), Married Layperson of the Archdiocese of St. Louis; Founder of the Cardinal Mindszenty Society (Missouri, USA)
 Elizabeth Anne Corcoran (Mary Neil) (1926-2017), Professed Religious of the Religious Sisters of Mercy (Maryland, USA)
 Vincent Michael Scanlan (Theophane) (1931-2017), Professed Priest of the Franciscan Third order Regulars (New York - Pennsylvania, USA)
 Steven McDonald (1957-2017), Married Layperson of the Archdiocese of New York (New York, USA)
 Elizabeth Louise Ebo (Mary Antona) (1924–2017), Professed Religious of the Franciscan Sisters of Mary (Illinois, USA – Missouri, USA)
 George Gillen (Francis Joseph) (1930–2017), Founder of the Brothers of Mercy of Saint John of God (Massachusetts, USA – Bulacan, Philippines)
 Eileen Calcagni George (1927–2017), Married Layperson of the Diocese of Worcester (Massachusetts, USA)
 Joseph Benedict Apostoli (Andrew) (1942–2017), Professed Priest and Cofounder of the Franciscan Friars of the Renewal (New Jersey, USA)
 Jerome Francis Conicker (1938–2018), Married Layperson of the Diocese of Steubenville; Founder of the Apostolate for Family Consecration (Illinois, USA – Wisconsin, USA)
 Peter Fehlner (Peter Damian Mary) (1931–2018), Professed Priest of the Franciscan Conventuals (New York – Massachusetts, USA)
 Anthony Freeman (1988–2018), Professed Religious of the Legionaries of Christ (Louisiana, USA – Rome, Italy)
 Gregory Allen Staab (1957–2018), Professed Priest of the Oblates of the Virgin Mary (Ohio – Massachusetts, USA)
 Linda Schubert (1936-2019), Married Layperson of the Diocese of San Jose in California; Member of the Catholic Charismatic Renewal (California, USA)
 James Vincent Schall (1928-2019), Professed Priest of the Jesuits (Iowa - California, USA)
 Lorraine Rita Moras Warren (1927-2019), Married Layperson of the Diocese of Bridgeport (Connecticut, USA)
 Harold Joseph Rahm (1919–2019), Profesed Priest, Jesuits (Texas, US – São Paulo, Brazil)
 Kendrick Castillo (2001-2019), Young Layperson of the Archdiocese of Denver; Martyr (Colorado, USA)
 Kristin Popik Burns (1950-2019), Married Layperson of the Diocese of Arlington (Virginia, USA)
 Richard Rieman (1925–2019), Priest of the Personal Prelature of the Holy Cross and Opus Dei (Illinois – Massachusetts, United States)
 Jason Paul Marshall (1966-2019), Seminarian of the Archdiocese of Santa Fe (New Mexico - Colorado, USA)
 Mary Elizabeth Lancaster (Mary Wilhelmina of the Most Holy Rosary) (1924-2019), Cofounder of the Benedictine Sisters of Mary, Queen of Apostles (Missouri, USA)
 Gilbert Espinosa Chávez (1932–2020), Auxiliary Bishop of San Diego (California, US)
 Eric Talley (1969–2021), Married Layperson of the Archdiocese of Denver (Texas – Colorado, USA)
 Ann Russell Miller (Mary Joseph of the Trinity) (1928–2021), Professed Religious of the Discalced Carmelite Nuns (California - Illinois, US)
 Ryan Stawaisz (1989–2021), Priest of the Archdiocese of Galveston-Houston (Scotland, United Kingdom – Texas, US)
 Janice McLaughlin (1942-2021), Professed Religious of the Maryknoll Sisters of Saint Dominic (Pennsylvania – New York, USA)
 Alice Jourdain von Hildebrand (1923-2022), Married Layperson of the Archdiocese of New York (Brussels, Belgium – New York, USA)
 Roberta Anne Drury (1989-2022), Layperson of the Diocese of Syracuse; Martyr (New York, USA)
 Paul Farmer (1959–2022), Married Layperson of the Archdiocese of Boston (Massachusetts, USA – Burera, Rwanda)
 Fra Martin de Porres Ward (1918–1999), the first African-American Conventual Franciscan and a missionary priest to Brazil

See also

Blessed

Congregation for the Causes of Saints
List of Brazilian saints
List of saints of the Canary Islands
List of Canadian Roman Catholic saints
List of Central American and Caribbean saints
List of Filipino saints, blesseds, and servants of God
List of Mexican saints
List of Saints from Africa
List of Saints from India
List of Saints from Oceania
List of Scandinavian saints
List of South American saints
List of European saints
Saint
Servant of God
Venerable

Footnotes

References
Amodei, Mike. "American Saints and Blesseds", Engaging Faith, January 5, 2009. Retrieved on 2009-10-09.
CatholicHistory.Net. "Spotlight: American Saints". Retrieved on 2009-10-09.
Congregation for the Causes of Saints. "Recent Saints canonized". Retrieved on 2009-10-13.
 Congregation for the Causes of Saints. "Recent Blesseds beatified". Retrieved on 2009-10-13.
 

 
 
Medjugorje Center of Pacifica. "All For Mary: American Saints". Retrieved on 2009-10-09.
Time. "American Saints", Time, April 7, 1930. Retrieved on 2009-10-09.
Tucson Citizen. "2 Tucson Priests to be beatified", June 12, 2007.

 

Saints
Saints
American
Z
Z

+
Saints
Saints